"A Medio Vivir" (English: "Half Living") is the title track and the third single from Ricky Martin's album, A Medio Vivir (1995). It was released as a single in the United States on February 13, 1996, and in May 1997 in Spain.

The song reached number thirty-six on the Hot Latin Songs in the United States.

Formats and track listings
US CD single
"A Medio Vivir" – 4:42

Charts

References

1996 singles
Ricky Martin songs
Spanish-language songs
Songs written by Franco De Vita
Pop ballads
1995 songs
Song recordings produced by K. C. Porter
Sony Discos singles
Columbia Records singles